The 2019–20 season was Swansea City's 100th season in the English football league system, and their second season back in the Championship since 2010–11 following relegation from the Premier League in the 2017–18 season. Along with competing in the Championship, the club competed in the FA Cup and EFL Cup losing in the third round of each respectively.

The season covered the period from 1 July 2019 to 30 June 2020 but was extraordinarily extended to 30 July 2020 because of the COVID-19 pandemic.

Club

First-team staff

First-team squad

 (on loan from Chelsea) 

 (on loan from Basel)
 (on loan from Liverpool) 
 (on loan from Watford)
 

 (on loan from Newcastle United) 

 (on loan from Chelsea)

Transfers

Transfers in

Transfers out

Loans in

Loans out

New contracts

Pre-season
The Swans announced pre-season fixtures against Mansfield Town, Crawley Town, Yeovil Town, Exeter City, Bristol Rovers and Atalanta.

Competitions

Overview

{| class="wikitable" style="text-align: center"
|-
!rowspan=2|Competition
!colspan=8|Record
|-
!
!
!
!
!
!
!
!
|-
| Championship

|-
| FA Cup

|-
| EFL Cup

|-
! Total

Championship

League table

Results summary

Results by matchday

Matches

On Thursday, 20 June 2019, the EFL Championship fixtures were revealed.

Championship play-offs

FA Cup

The second round draw was made live on BBC Two from Etihad Stadium, Micah Richards and Tony Adams conducted the draw.

EFL Cup

The first round draw was made on 20 June. The second round draw was made on 13 August 2019 following the conclusion of all but one first round matches. The third round draw was confirmed on 28 August 2019, live on Sky Sports.

Statistics

Appearances, goals, and cards

|-
! colspan=14 style=background:#dcdcdc; text-align:center| Goalkeepers

|-
! colspan=14 style=background:#dcdcdc; text-align:center| Defenders

|-
! colspan=14 style=background:#dcdcdc; text-align:center| Midfielders

|-
! colspan=14 style=background:#dcdcdc; text-align:center| Forwards

|-
! colspan=14 style=background:#dcdcdc; text-align:center| Out On Loan

|-
! colspan=14 style=background:#dcdcdc; text-align:center| Left During Season

|-

Disciplinary record

References

Swansea City
Swansea City A.F.C. seasons
Welsh football clubs 2019–20 season